Omm ol Sakhar (also Romanized as Omm ol Şakhar and Omm oş Şakhar) is a village in Moshrageh Rural District, Moshrageh District, Ramshir County, Khuzestan Province, Iran. At the 2006 census, its population was 542, in 101 families.

References 

Populated places in Ramshir County